ISO 2047 (Information processing – Graphical representations for the control characters of the 7-bit coded character set) is a standard for graphical representation of the control characters for debugging purposes, such as may be found in the character generator of a computer terminal; it also establishes a two-letter abbreviation of each control character. It started out as ANSI X3.32-1973 (American National Standard – Graphic Representation of the Control Characters of American National Standard Code for Information Interchange in 1973 and became an ISO standard in 1975. In addition,  "Character Mnemonics & Character Sets" is cited as the ISO 2047 two-letter abbreviation of the control character. ISO 2047, ECMA-17 in Europe, GB/T 3911-1983 in China, that corresponds to KS X 1010 in Korea (formerly KS C 5713) has been established as a standard. It was enacted "graphical representation of information exchange capabilities for character" JIS X 0209:1976 (former JIS C 6227) in Japan, and was abolished on January 20, 2010.

While the ISO/IEC 646 three-letter abbreviation (such as "ESC"), or caret notation (such as "^[") are still in use, the graphical symbols of ISO 2047 are considered outdated and rare.

Character table

References

External links 
 ECMA-17 (Ecma International equivalent)
 BN-76/3101-05 (Polish equivalent)

02047